Terraformer is the third album by Swiss band Knut, released in 2005 on Hydra Head Records.

Track listing
 "7.08"– 1:32
 "WYRIWYS" – 4:48
 "Kyoto" – 4:19
 "Torvalds" – 3:03
 "Seattle" – 1:50
 "Bollingen" – 1:51
 "Solar Flare" – 7:30
 "Fallujah" – 2:10
 "Genoa" – 1:43
 "Davos" – 2:28
 "Evian" – 7:12
 "Fibonacci Unfolds" – 6:27

Personnel
 Didier Severin – vocals/electronics
 Jeremy Tavernier – bass/guitar 
 Roderic Mounir – drums/guitar
 Philippe Hess - guitar

References

Knut (band) albums
2005 albums
Hydra Head Records albums
Albums with cover art by Aaron Turner